Periwinkle Run is a stream in Preble County, Ohio, in the United States. Periwinkle Run was named for the freshwater snail shells collected there which the early settlers called periwinkles.

Location
Mouth: Confluence with Sevenmile Creek northwest of Eaton at 
Source: Preble County at

See also
List of rivers of Ohio

References

Rivers of Preble County, Ohio
Rivers of Ohio